Partubiola blancha is a species of small sea snail, a marine gastropod mollusk in the family Skeneidae,.

Distribution
This species is endemic to Australia, occurring off New South Wales.

References

 Iredale, T. 1936. Australian molluscan notes. No. 2. Records of the Australian Museum 19(5): 267–340, pls 20-24 
 Iredale, T. & McMichael, D.F. 1962. A reference list of the marine Mollusca of New South Wales. Memoirs of the Australian Museum 11: 1-109

blancha
Gastropods described in 1936